The 1986 Kansas State Wildcats football team represented Kansas State University in the 1986 NCAA Division I-A football season.  The team's head football coach was Stan Parrish.  The Wildcats played their home games in KSU Stadium.  They  finished with a record of 2–9 overall and 1–6 in Big Eight Conference play.

The Wildcats' October 18 win against rival Kansas would be the program's last victory for 31 games, stretching until the 1989 season, when they defeated North Texas 20–17 on a last-second touchdown pass.  Kansas State posted a 0-30-1 record during the streak, with the lone tie also coming against Kansas in 1987.

Schedule

Personnel

Game summaries

Oklahoma

References

Kansas State
Kansas State Wildcats football seasons
Kansas State Wildcats football